Pedro Gilbert or Don Pedro Gibert (c. 1800 – June 11, 1835) was an early 19th-century pirate, who was one of the few remaining pirates continuing to raid shipping on the Atlantic coast.

Biography
A former privateer in the service of the Colombian government, Gilbert began raiding American merchant vessels off the eastern coast of Florida with his schooner, the Panda in early 1832. On September 21, 1832, off the coast of what is now Stuart, Florida, Gilbert chased then boarded the Mexican, an American brig bound from Salem to Rio de Janeiro carrying $20,000 in silver. Following the crew's surrender, a crew member asked Gilbert what was to be done with their captives, to which the pirate captain reportedly remarked, "Dead cats don't mew. You know what to do."

Locking the crew inside the forecastle, Gilbert's crew ransacked the ship, looting the Mexican's stores. Slashing the rigging and sails, the pirates filled the ship's galley with combustibles and set the ship afire with the crew trapped inside. However, the crew managed to break out after an hour and eventually doused the fire, although they continued to let enough smoke billow until the pirates were out of sight. After six weeks at sea, the crew finally made it back to Salem, where they were able to report the incident. Gilbert was eventually captured in West Africa two years later when his ship was sunk in a naval engagement with the British brig sloop HMS Curlew, commanded by Henry Dundas Trotter. Extradited to the United States, he was tried with three of his crew members in Boston, Massachusetts and executed on June 11, 1835.

Memorial
A sandbar off Stuart which the pirates often used to lure unsuspecting ships is marked on nautical charts as "Gilbert's Bar."

References

Bottling, Douglas. The Pirates. Alexandria, Virginia: Time-Life Books Inc., 1978.
Joaniquet, Angel. Pirates i corsaris catalans. Editorial Noray, 1997.
Pickering, David. Pirates: From Corsairs and Cutlasses to Parrots and Planks. Collins, 2006.

Further reading
Gilbert, Pedro. A Report of the Trial of Pedro Gilbert. Boston: Russell, Oridorne and Metcalf, 1834.
Gilbert, Pedro. Trial of the Twelve Spanish Pirates of the Schooner Panda, A Guinea Slaver... For Robbery and Piracy, Committed on Boards the Brig Mexican, 20 Sept. 1832. Boston: Lemuel Gulliver, 1834.

External links
Don Pedro Gilbert at Age of Pirates.com

1800 births
1835 deaths
19th-century Spanish people
19th-century pirates
Spanish pirates
Privateers
Prisoners and detainees of the British military
People extradited from the United Kingdom to the United States
People executed by the United States federal government
People executed by Massachusetts
People executed for piracy
19th-century executions by the United States
Spanish people executed abroad